USS Virginian has been the name of more than one United States Navy ship, and may refer to:

, a tugboat in commission from 1918 to 1919
, a troop transport in commission in 1919

See also

Virginian (disambiguation)

United States Navy ship names